The 1915 Boston Braves season was the 45th season of the franchise. The Braves finished second in the National League with a record of 83 wins and 69 losses, seven games behind the National League champion Philadelphia Phillies.  The 1915 season was notable for the opening of Braves Field on August 13, the last of the National League's "jewel box" stadiums to be built.  (Weeghman Park in Chicago, while opened in 1914, would not be occupied by the Cubs until the next season.)  Prior to the opening of Braves Field, the Braves had played in Fenway Park for the first half of the 1915 season and the last 27 games of the 1914 season, having left their only previous home, South End Grounds, on August 11, 1914.

In the final game of the season, a 15–8 loss to the New York Giants, Joe Shannon made his final Major League appearance, and Red Shannon made his first Major League appearance.  The two were twins, marking the first of three times that twins played on the same team (along with Eddie and Johnny O'Brien and Jose and Ozzie Canseco).

Offseason 
 February 14, 1915: Oscar Dugey, Possum Whitted, and cash were traded by the Braves to the Philadelphia Phillies for Sherry Magee.

Regular season

Season standings

Record vs. opponents

Roster

Player stats

Batting

Starters by position 
Note: Pos = Position; G = Games played; AB = At bats; H = Hits; Avg. = Batting average; HR = Home runs; RBI = Runs batted in

Other batters 
Note: G = Games played; AB = At bats; H = Hits; Avg. = Batting average; HR = Home runs; RBI = Runs batted in

Pitching

Starting pitchers 
Note: G = Games pitched; IP = Innings pitched; W = Wins; L = Losses; ERA = Earned run average; SO = Strikeouts

Other pitchers 
Note: G = Games pitched; IP = Innings pitched; W = Wins; L = Losses; ERA = Earned run average; SO = Strikeouts

Relief pitchers 
Note: G = Games pitched; W = Wins; L = Losses; SV = Saves; ERA = Earned run average; SO = Strikeouts

References

External links
1915 Boston Braves season at Baseball Reference

Boston Braves seasons
Boston Braves
Boston Braves
1910s in Boston